The men's 4 × 200 metres relay at the 2015 IAAF World Relays was held at the Thomas Robinson Stadium on 3 May.

On paper this race looked like a Jamaican record attempt with the American team their closest competitor.  Jamaica brought all its guns, and strategically held out Usain Bolt and Nickel Ashmeade from the qualifying round.  But when it came time for the final, Bolt was nowhere to be seen.  A minor hamstring injury earlier in the meet kept the world record holder in the locker room listening to music when the finals were held.  The first two legs went as scripted with Jamaica taking a significant lead, but at the second handoff, Jason Livermore seemed completely unprepared to take a handoff, standing flatfooted as Rasheed Dwyer passed him and handed the baton backward.  Still the Jamaican handoff was legal, just costing the team valuable seconds.  In the adjacent lane, the American team saw Curtis Mitchell line up in the wrong spot and while Isiah Young came in on the inside of his lane, Mitchell performed first a lane violation then after being passed by Young, a pirouette to drop the baton outside of the end of the zone.  Mitchell picked up the baton to continue now well back in the field.  Out of this chaos, the well trained French squad was left in the lead through the final turn.  It was only the difference in Warren Weir's superior speed that allowed him to pass Ben Bassaw on the home stretch to take Jamaica to victory.  USA crossed the line in third, but were disqualified for the handoff violation.

Records
Prior to the competition, the records were as follows:

Schedule

Results

Heats
Qualification: First 2 of each heat (Q) plus the 2 fastest times (q) advanced to the final.

Final
The final was started at 21:29.

References

4 x 200 metres relay
4 × 200 metres relay